The 2011 Bangladesh coup d'état attempt was a coup planned for 11–12 January 2012 that was stopped by the Bangladesh Army in December 2011. This was announced at a press conference on 19 January 2012. The purpose of the coup was to establish Islamic law in Bangladesh. A number of officers including retired ones were arrested. The coup plotters argued that they were nationalists trying to prevent Bangladesh from being turned into a puppet of India.

Background
In 2009 few months after Prime Minister Sheikh Hasina came to power; the BDR Mutiny by border-security soldiers in Pilkhana in Dhaka led to 56 officers being killed. Some 800 Paramilitary personnel were charged for their involvement in the mutiny, and the crisis frayed ties between the civilian administration and elements of the military establishment. In 1975, mutinying soldiers had killed Hasina's father, Bangladesh's first Prime Minister — Sheikh Mujibur Rahman.

The alleged conspiracy against the government comes more than a year after five military officers were sentenced to five years of imprisonment in a court-martial for their "involvement" in attempted murder of Fazle Noor Taposh, the influential nephew of Sheikh Hasina, following the 2009 mutiny by Bangladesh Rifles.

Coup
The Bangladesh Army reported a failed coup d'état was supposed to take place in January 2012 by rogue military officers and expatriate but was stopped by the Bangladesh army in December 2011. Brigadier General Muhammad Mashud Razzaq, director of Personnel Services Directorate disclosed the plot at the Army Officers Club in Dhaka Cantonment on 19 January 2012. He also 14-16 mid ranking officers were involved, including Syed Mohammad Ziaul Haque alias Major Zia. Major Zia had called senior to midlevel army officers in different bases in the country to bring out soldiers under their command to establish Sharia law. His post on Facebook was published by the Daily Amar desh which created coup-rumors in the army. Major Zia used a UK based roaming sim to contact fellow army officers. A retired officer, Lieutenant Colonel Ehsan Yusuf was also involved in the plot.

Military officials stated that the coup was instigated by hard-line Islamist military officers, while University of Dhaka political scientist Ataur Rahman and other analysts suggested it may have been caused by military unrest over a 2009 crackdown on the military. Intelligence sources quoted by The Christian Science Monitor reported that the coup was an attempt to introduce sharia law by Islamist military officers with ties to Hizbut Tahrir, an Islamist group that is outlawed in Bangladesh. The coup attempt had apparently been planned over several weeks or months with support of religious fanatics outside of Bangladesh. Military sources said that up to 16 hard-line Islamist officers were involved in the coup, with some of them being detained. Lieutenant colonel Ehsan Yusuf was arrested on 15 December 2011 and Major Zakir Hossain 31 December 2011.

Brig. Gen. Muhammad Masud Razzaq, Director of the Personnel Services Directorate described the conspiracy involving a dozen active duty and retired officers that he said was intended "to spread disaffection in the Bangladeshi Army." The Brigadier said the plot was uncovered in December following the detention of mastermind Ghulam Azam, former Ameer of the Jamaat-e-Islami Bangladesh. Azam, who opposed the independence of Bangladesh during and after the 1971 war, is alleged to have led the Razakar and Al-Badr formations that resisted the India-trained Mukti Bahini. A slew of arrests had taken place silently in Bangladesh through December, prompting Khaleda Zia the former Prime Minister to allege that army officers were becoming victims of "sudden disappearance".

Aftermath
On 28 December, a military court of inquiry was established to investigate the matter and punish those involved. Retired Major General Sayed Mohammad Ibrahim, a defense analyst, said the country and its democratic structures were reasonably immune to interference. "Today's news about events in the army is worrying but will not cause any damage to democracy," he said. The military spokesperson also said the initial investigations found non-resident Bangladeshis (NRB) link to the plot while at least one of the officers, the fugitive Major, was linked to banned Islamist group Hizbut Tahrir. He mentioned, "Stringent legal measures will be taken against the persons involved in the conspiracy after proper investigation." The army spokesman underlined that banking on the army in the past, "different evil forces availed political gains and made abortive attempts to do so but as an institution, military still has to bear the stigma". non-resident Bangladeshi, Ishraq Ahmed, who was involved in the coup said the coup goal was topple Prime Minister Sheikh Hasina from “letting Bangladesh be 'turned into a Bantustan' run by India”. Major Syed Mohammad Ziaul Haq and Ishraq Ahmed are on the run.

See also
 List of coups d'état and coup attempts since 2010

References

2010s coups d'état and coup attempts
Coup d'etat attempt
Military coups in Bangladesh
December 2011 events in Bangladesh
2011 in military history
2011 crimes in Bangladesh
Bangladesh–India relations